Polje ob Sotli is a settlement on the right bank of the Sotla River in the Municipality of Podčetrtek in eastern Slovenia. The area around Podčetrtek was traditionally part of the region of Styria. It is now included in the Savinja Statistical Region.

Name
The name of the settlement was changed from Polje to Polje ob Sotli in 1953.

Church
The parish church in the settlement is dedicated to Saint Nicholas and belongs to the Roman Catholic Diocese of Celje. It was first mentioned in written documents dating to 1545, but was expanded and rebuilt on a number of occasions.

References

External links
Polje ob Sotli on Geopedia

Populated places in the Municipality of Podčetrtek